Sancaktepe is a district in the suburbs of Istanbul, Turkey. It became a district in the year 2009.

History 
Sancaktepe's oldest historic structure is Damatris Summer Palace that was built by I. Tiberius Konstantinos (578–582) and Mavrikos (582–602) in Byzantine Age. Turks started to come to Sancaktepe in the 7th century but they could not be permanent up to the Ottoman. Ottoman Empire conquered this area completely in 1328.

Notable buildings and structures
Istanbul Samandıra Army Air Base
Sancaktepe Prof. Dr. Feriha Öz Emergency Hospital
Sancaktepe Stadium

References

 
Populated places in Istanbul Province